Kasper Poul Mølgaard Jørgensen (born 7 November 1999) is a Danish professional footballer who plays as a right-back for Danish Superliga club AaB.

Club career

Early career
Jørgensen is a youth product of the FC Nordsjælland academy and joined Brøndby IF at the age of 18 in the summer 2018, to play for the club's under-19s. He was a regular starter for the team, but left the club at the end of his one-year contract in June 2019.

Lyngby
On 11 July 2019, Jørgensen signed his first professional contract with Lyngby Boldklub after a short trial at the club. Jørgensen signed a three-year deal and got his debut already less than two weeks later, 22 July, in a Danish Superliga game against Odense Boldklub. Jørgensen started on the bench, before replacing Adnan Mohammad in the 64th minute.

Loan to Aalesunds FK
On 5 October 2020, it was confirmed, that Jørgensen would play on loan for Norwegian club Aalesunds FK for the rest of 2020.

AaB
On 9 January 2023 AaB confirmed, that Jørgensen had signed with the club until the end of 2025. AaB reportedly paid just over DKK 5 million for Jørgensen.

Career statistics

References

External links
Kasper Jørgensen at the Danish Football Association (in Danish)

Living people
1999 births
Association football defenders
Denmark youth international footballers
Denmark under-21 international footballers
Danish men's footballers
Danish expatriate men's footballers
FC Nordsjælland players
Brøndby IF players
Lyngby Boldklub players
Aalesunds FK players
AaB Fodbold players
Danish Superliga players
Danish 1st Division players
Danish expatriate sportspeople in Norway
Expatriate footballers in Norway